The 1999 Paris–Roubaix was the 97th running of the Paris–Roubaix single-day cycling race, often known as the Hell of the North. These are the results for the 1999 edition of the Paris–Roubaix cycling classic, in which Andrea Tafi won and  team took all positions in the podium.

Results
11-04-1999: Compiègne–Roubaix, 273 km.

References

1999
1999 in French sport
1999 in road cycling
1999 UCI Road World Cup
April 1999 sports events in Europe